Alaçam is a village in Mut district of Mersin Province, Turkey. At   it is situated to the northwest of Mut and south of Magras Mountain a part of Taurus Mountains. The population of Alaçam was 808 as of 2012. The first reference to the village is dated at 1913. The origin of the population was probably a Turkmen tribe named Karadöneli. The main economic activity is agriculture. But irrigation is an important problem. Main crops of the village are cereals and grapes which require little irrigation. Towards Göksu River to east olive and apricot are also produced.

References

Villages in Mut District